Polesie Landscape Park (Poleski Park Krajobrazowy) is a protected area (Landscape Park) in eastern Poland, established in 1983, covering an area of .

The Park lies within Lublin Voivodeship, in Włodawa County (Gmina Stary Brus, Gmina Urszulin). It forms part of the buffer zone of Polesie National Park, which was previously a part of it.

References 

Polesie
Parks in Lublin Voivodeship
Włodawa County